Kafr ʿInān, is a former Palestinian village, depopulated in the 1948 Arab–Israeli war.

In ancient times, it was known as Kfar Hananiah, and was a large Jewish village and a significant pottery production center. Archaeological surveys indicate Kefar Hanania was founded in the Early Roman period, and was inhabited through the Byzantine period. It was resettled in the Middle Ages and the modern era. By mid 1500, the village  was wholly Muslim and was known as Kafr 'Inan. 

Kafr ʿInān was captured by Israel during the 1948 Arab–Israeli war.  Those who managed to remain  were subsequently expelled from the village by the Israel Defense Forces (IDF) to the West Bank or to other Arab towns in the newly established Israel. Many villagers managed to "infiltrate" back to Kafr ʿInān, but on three separate occasions in January and February 1949 the Israeli army expelled them.

A shrine for the Sheikh Abu Hajar Azraq and the remains of a small domed building are still standing, along with the remains of various burial sites of rabbis. In 1989, the Israeli village of Kfar Hananya was established on Kafr ʿInān land on a hill adjacent to the former Palestinian village.

History

Roman and Byzantine Kfar Hanania
The earliest mentions of the village occur in sources from the Roman and Byzantine periods in Galilee, when it was then a Jewish village known as Kefar Hananya (or Kfar Hanania), that served as a center for pottery production in the Galilee. Most of the cooking ware in the Galilee between the 1st century BCE and the beginning of the 5th century CE was produced here. A Byzantine-period synagogue was partially carved out of the rock, probably during the 5th century CE, and its remains have been excavated east of the village. Khalidi mentions shafts and bases of columns, caves, a pool, and a burial ground discovered in archaeological excavations.

During the Second Temple period, within a distance of less than a kilometer from Kfar Hananya, was the thriving village of Bersabe (now Khirbet es-Saba [Kh. Abu esh-Shebaʿ], Beer Sheba of the Galilee), a village mentioned in the writings of Josephus.

Among the Kfar Hanania's most respected personages who is said to have been buried there was a Tanna (Jewish sage) of the 1st century, Eliezer ben Jacob I. The Talmud mentions it as the home of Rabbi Jacob of Kfar Hanan, a third-generation amora. As a result of Aramaic influence, the village became known as Kafr Hanan, a shortened form of Hananiah.

An Aramaic inscription dated to the 5th or 6th century was found on a kelilah (a polycandelon, i.e. a bronze chandelier holding glass lamps and suspended from the ceiling) in or near the Galilean village of Kefar Makr near Acre, reading "This polycandelon [kelilah] … [offered] to the holy place [the synagogue] of Kefar Hananyah. May they be remembered for good. Amen, selah, shalom, ptp t". The chandelier, now exhibited in a Belgian museum, bears the inscription next to the images of Judaic religious objects: two menorahs (seven-branched candlesticks), a lulav (palm frond) and a shofar (ram's horn); for illustrations see here.

Pottery production
Rabbinic literature mentions Kfar Hanania village in relation to the production of pottery; in the Tosefta (Bava Metzia 6:3), there is a reference to, "those who make black clay, such as Kefar Hananya and its neighbors." Late Roman-era pottery types of the kind made in Kafr 'Inan have been found all throughout the Galilee and the Golan.

Crusader to Mamluk period
Ya'akov ben Netan'el, who visited the village in the 12th century during the period of Crusader rule, writes about the ruins of a synagogue quarried into the hill. Potential references to the village include a mention of the "widow of Ben al-'Anani" in a 12th-century Genizah document and to Kfar Hanan in the 13th century. In 1211, Samuel ben Samson travelled from Tiberias and Kfar Hanania before stopping in Safed. In the 14th century, another traveller transcribes the village's name as Kefar Hanin.

Ottoman period: Kafr ʿInan
In 1522, Jewish traveler Moses ben Mordecai Bassola found about 30 families of Musta'arabi Jews (Arabic-speaking Jews, as opposed to Sephardi Jews) among the residents, most of whom of priestly stock, making it the fifth largest Jewish community in the country at the time, out of the eight places named by him. An Ottoman census taken two years later (1525) listed 14 Jewish families.

It is during the rule of the Ottoman Empire that the form Kafr ʿInān (Kafr 'Anan) first appears. The village is listed in the tax records of either 1549 or 1596, as forming part of the nahiya (subdistrict) of Jira, part of Safad Sanjak, with 21 households and 8 bachelors; an estimated population of 259. All the villagers were Muslim. They paid taxes on goats, beehives and on its press, which was used either for olives or grapes; a total of 12,272 akçe. All of the revenue went to a Waqf. A map from Napoleon's invasion of 1799 by Pierre Jacotin showed the place, named as "K. Hanein".

In 1881, the PEF's Survey of Western Palestine described the village as being built of stone and having 150-200 Muslim residents. The arable land in the village comprised gardens and olive trees.

A population list from about 1887 showed that Kafr 'Inan had 80 inhabitants; all Muslim.

British Mandate period
In the 1922 census of Palestine conducted by the British Mandate authorities, Kufr Enan had a population of 179; all Muslims, increasing in the 1931 census to 264, still all Muslims, in a total of 47 houses.

Of this, a total of 1,740 dunums were used for the cultivation of cereals, 1,195 dunums were irrigated or used for orchards and most of these (1,145 dunums) were planted with olive trees, while 21 dunams were built-up (urban) area. The village, however, occupied an area of only 25 dunams (6.1 acres).

The village houses, made of stone with mud mortar, were bunched close together and separated by semi-circular, narrow alleys. Many new houses were constructed during the last years of Mandatory Palestine. Springs and domestic wells supplied drinking water. Olives and grain were the main crops. Grain was grown in the nearby flat zones and valleys.

Israeli period

Capture, evacuation and land expropriation
The village was captured on 30 October 1948 by the Golani Brigade as part of Operation Hiram and following the war the area was incorporated into the State of Israel. However, according to Walid Khalidi, the villagers refused to leave like most of the population in the area. Morris reports that the Israeli authorities classified the village as "abandoned" but the villagers kept returning. In January 1949, the IDF expelled 54, and moved another 128 inhabitants from Kafr 'Inan and Farradiyya to other villages in Israel. On 4 February 1949, units of the 79th Battalion surrounded the two villages and expelled 45 people to the West Bank. The 200 villagers who had permits to stay, mostly old men, women and children, were transferred to Majd al Kurum. Yet again, the villagers returned. By mid-February 1949 there were about 100 back in the two villages, according to IDF sources. The two villages were again evacuated by the IDF.

The expulsion of the villagers upset some members of Mapam, who condemned David Ben-Gurion and the army. However, a suggestion for a Knesset motion calling for the establishment of an inquiry to probe the expulsions of the villagers of Kafr 'Inan, Farradiyya and Al-Ghabisiyya, was apparently never brought to the Knesset plenum.

In 1950, Article 125 of the Defence regulation of 1945 was invoked in order to confiscate the land belonging to a number of Palestinian Arab villages in Galilee, among them Kafr 'Inan. This law was also used to prevent the villagers from returning to their homes even by legal means.

Aftermath
The modern Jewish village of Kfar Hananya was first planned to the south of the depopulated Kafr ʿInān village in 1982, and was eventually established there in 1989 on village land (though not on the actual site of Kafr ʿInān). Chazon, built in 1969 on the lands of Al-Mansura, Tiberias, and Parod, built in 1949 on the lands of Al-Farradiyya (District of Safad), are both close to the village site, but not on village land. In 1992, Palestinian historian Walid Khalidi found piles of stones, clusters of cacti, fig trees, the remains of a domed building on a slope facing the village and the small shrine of Shaykh Abu Hajar Azraq on an adjacent hill to the east. The land around the site is forested and planted with fruit trees by the settlement of Parod."

Archaeology

Roman to Byzantine-period village
In 1933, Joseph Braslavsky was the first to identify the quarried synagogue in Kafr 'Inan, based on the testimony of a local Arab peasant. In 1989, the site was surveyed by Zvi Ilan. Adan-Bayewitz, of the Martin (Szusz) Department of Land of Israel Studies and Archaeology at Bar Ilan University conducted archaeological research at the site from 1987 to 1988, and excavated a late Roman-era pottery kiln in 1992–1993, with a stone-paved approach.

See also
 Depopulated Palestinian locations in Israel
 Palestinian refugee
 Present absentee
 Shikhin, village near Sepphoris, another major pottery production centre in Roman Galilee

Gallery

References

Bibliography

 [reprinted from earlier Livorno edition]

External links
Welcome To Kafr 'Inan
Kafr 'Inan, Zochrot
Kefar Ḥananyah entry at The Oxford Encyclopedia of Archaeology in the Near East by the head of excavations, David Adan-Bayewitz. Accessed 26 April 2021.
 Parod - 2009 (Israel Antiquities Authority) Aqueduct that served both Parod (Farradiyya) and Kafr 'Inan (Kefar Hananiah)
Survey of Western Palestine, Map 4: IAA, Wikipedia mirror
, Saturday, 3.10.2009, by Umar Ighbariyyeh, from Zochrot

District of Acre
Arab villages depopulated during the 1948 Arab–Israeli War
Talmud places
Ancient synagogues in the Land of Israel
Ancient Jewish settlements of Galilee